South Wales RLFC was a rugby league club formed in 1995. South Wales during their existence played at Morfa Stadium, Swansea, the Talbot Athletic Ground, Aberavon and Cardiff Arms Park.

A team formed in late 2009 also used the name South Wales RLFC before going on to become known as South Wales Scorpions then South Wales Ironmen before moving to West Wales and playing as West Wales Raiders.

History

History of rugby league in South Wales

The South Wales region had always been an attractive area to the rugby league because of its similarities to Yorkshire and Lancashire in having a mass industrial population which followed rugby enthusiastically. In 1907 a team representing Aberdare was formed, and by 1908-09 there were six Welsh rugby league teams with clubs based in Ebbw Vale, Merthyr Tydfill, Mid Rhondda, Treherbert and Barry. All of these clubs were defunct by 1912. Ebbw Vale survived the longest, five seasons.

Encouraged by the 22,000 strong crowd which attended the Wales vs England match in 1926, local promoters established a club in Pontypridd. The club initially experienced good sized crowds however poor results soon saw attendances drop, and the club only lasted eight games into its second season before folding.

A team was formed in Cardiff and played in the 1947/48 and 1951/52 seasons.

Rugby league would not revisit south Wales until 1981 to 1985 when the Cardiff City Blue Dragons existed as a club. Much like its predecessors initial interest waned when the club suffered from poor results, low attendances and a relocation to Bridgend before they finally disbanded at the end of the 1985 season.

South Wales RLFC
South Wales RLFC during their first season (1996) in the Rugby Football League were reasonably successful and came fifth in the second division; winning twelve games and losing ten. Games were played at Talbot Athletic Ground Aberavon, one game was played at Morfa Stadium Swansea against Bramley and all the games for the second half of the season were at Cardiff Arms Park. They were coached by Clive Griffiths and assisted by Danny Sheehy. 

Initially the club had no playing kit of their own so they borrowed the Welsh international team's kit for the first three games. After that they wore a specially designed plain red strip with the traditional three feathers logo to distinguish them from the national side.

The first home game played at Aberavon on 31 March 1996 saw an attendance of 1,876, when the club played Hull Kingston Rovers and lost 70-8. Crowds fluctuated depending upon where the club played, and the last home game of the season saw a crowd of only 400 witness the club defeating York 20-16 at Cardiff Arms Park.

Due to the relative success of the club and their geographical location outside the heartlands of British rugby league, the club had high hopes that it would be awarded a Super League franchise. A case was put forward by Mike Nicholas and Clive Griffiths and was initially accepted after a 16-11 vote by the RFL council. However at the beginning of September, the RFL Board of Directors refused a final endorsement of a Super League place with a £1 million guarantee of support deemed 'insufficient'. The franchise was then awarded to Gateshead Thunder instead. A meeting a few days later decided to place the South Wales in the second tier of British rugby league, the First Division, but the club decided that this would not be financially viable and the decision was made to disband the club altogether before the start of the 1997 season.

Players

During their first, and only, season South Wales utilised forty-two players.

Seasons

References

See also
Sport in Cardiff 
Rugby league in Wales

Welsh rugby league teams
Defunct rugby league teams in Wales
Rugby league in Wales
Sport in Cardiff
Rugby clubs established in 1995